Samuel Smyth (25 February 1925 – 19 October 2016) was a Northern Irish footballer who played in the Football League for Wolverhampton Wanderers, Stoke City and Liverpool.

Career
Smyth was born in Belfast in 1925 and played for local clubs Distillery, Linfield and Dundela in the Irish League before being signed by English Football League side Wolverhampton Wanderers in July 1947 for a fee of £1,100. Despite taking Wolves to third place in the 1946–47 season manager Ted Vizard was replaced by his assistant Stan Cullis in June 1948. The following year Cullis led Wolves to the FA Cup final against Leicester City, Jesse Pye scoring two goals in the first half and Smyth netting another in the 68th minute. Smyth had scored both Wolves goals in the two semi-final games against Manchester Utd. The following season Wolves finished in 2nd place in the First Division. He had scored 43 goals in 116 cup and league appearances for Wolves.

In September 1951 Stoke City paid a club record fee of £25,000 to Wolves for Smyth in a bid to help them avoid relegation after an awful start to the 1951–52 season. Smyth had the desired impact at the Victoria Ground as he scored 12 vital goals as Stoke escaped the drop by three points. He scored five goals in 14 matches in 1952–53 before being sold to Liverpool in January 1953 for a fee of £12,000. Smyth made his debut for his new club against the side he just departed, Stoke just days later. He spent two seasons at Anfield scoring 20 goals in 44 appearances.

After football
Smyth returned to Belfast where he played for Bangor and also worked as a bookmaker. He later opened his own sports distribution business which sold sports equipment throughout Ireland. He and his wife Enid regularly traveled to the Caribbean to visit their daughter and after his wife's passing in 2002 he later moved to live with his daughter. He died on 19 October 2016 at the age of 91 and was the last surviving player from the 1949 FA Cup winning team and the Stoke City team.

Career statistics

Club
Source:

International
Source:

References

External links
 LFC profile
 Northern Ireland profile
 

1925 births
2016 deaths
Association footballers from Belfast
Association footballers from Northern Ireland
Northern Ireland international footballers
Lisburn Distillery F.C. players
Linfield F.C. players
Wolverhampton Wanderers F.C. players
Stoke City F.C. players
Liverpool F.C. players
Bangor F.C. players
Association football forwards
Pre-1950 IFA international footballers
English Football League players
FA Cup Final players